Odontostomatida is a small order of ciliates, referred to as odontostomes. They use their cilia, or hair-like structures on unicellular organisms, to propel themselves.

References

Ciliate orders
Heterotrichea